Toruń (209 thousand inhabitants, 0,6 million in a Two-City agglomeration). The airport in Toruń possesses already a runway of 4100 ft. There is a pressure from local politicians to adapt the local airport to serve domestic flights, and, after expanding the landing strip by (version 1–200 meters, version II- 500) meters to over (v.I- 1500 meters, version II-2000 meters), also international flights to this tourist destination, that due to its unique gothic-styled city-centre is on the UNESCO world heritage list and is one of the favourite Polish tourist destinations.

History
The airport was opened before World War I in 1912- 1913. It served for military purposes.

Airport infrastructure
There exists a railroad line nearby the terminal that can be used for passenger service.

References

External links
 official website of current manager
 - Polish description of the campaign to revive the airport

Airports in Poland
Buildings and structures in Toruń